Christopher Wiehl (born ) is an American actor.

Life and career
Wiehl was born in Yakima, Washington and is of Danish and German descent. His father, Dick Wiehl, was an agent with the Federal Bureau of Investigation (FBI). He graduated from the University of Washington with a Bachelor of Arts degree in dramatic arts. He is the younger brother of author and Fox News Channel legal analyst Lis Wiehl.

Wiehl starred in several plays during college including Henry V, The Owl and the Pussycat and Lonestar.

Perhaps his most prominent role has been as the quarterback Derek McConnell in ESPN's short-lived series Playmakers. Wiehl has made guest appearances on television shows including Popular, CSI: Crime Scene Investigation, Birds of Prey and Charmed (for the episode Animal Pragmatism). He had a spotlight role in the 2000 film Broken Hearts Club as J.Crew Guy. He also played a small role in the movie Can't Hardly Wait.

Wiehl was a guest star on Buffy the Vampire Slayer during season one, in the role of "Owen" in the episode "Never Kill a Boy on the First Date". He also played a police officer in Hollywood Homicide in 2003 as "Cheeseburger Cop".

In 2006, he played Jake Dunne on Love Monkey. He had a recurring role as Roger on Jericho. He plays art gallery owner Patrick on Switched at Birth.

Filmography

References

External links 
 

1970 births
Living people
Male actors from Washington (state)
American male television actors
People from Yakima, Washington
University of Washington alumni